Kathryn Holloway (or variants) may refer to:

Kathryn Holloway (volleyball)
Kathryn Holloway (police commissioner), British police commissioner and radio and television presenter
Kathryn Holloway (politician), see Trinity—Spadina (provincial electoral district)
Katherine Holloway, Door to Door character played by Jane Kaczmarek